Aeroflot Flight 630 was a Soviet domestic passenger flight from Dushanbe to Moscow via Leninabad (now Khujand in Tajikistan) that crashed on 24 February 1973, killing all 79 people on board, including five children. The accident has been attributed to the loss of control.

Aircraft
The aircraft involved in the accident was an Ilyushin Il-18V turboprop airliner with serial number 189001803. The aircraft was equipped with Ivchenko AI-20K engines and made its maiden flight in 1959. At the time of the accident, the aircraft sustained 20,404 flight hours and 9,590 pressurization cycles.

Crash
Subsequently, the autopilot was disengaged and the aircraft began turning to the right. After a 60-degree turn, the aircraft started banking to the left, with an angular velocity of 3–4 deg/s. Having reached a 90-degree bank angle, the aircraft fell into a steep left spiral with an increased vertical speed of 100 m/s and increasing normal g forces. The debris impacted an area  and caught fire.

Investigation
Having found no mechanical or structural failures in the aircraft, the investigation did not reach any conclusions, although it noted that the ATC did not track the flight at the last stage. The Ministry of Aviation Industry of the USSR found that the accident was caused by a navigation error and the crew trying an intense left banking and descend, which led to the loss of control.

References

1973 in the Soviet Union
Aviation accidents and incidents in 1973
Accidents and incidents involving the Ilyushin Il-18
630
Airliner accidents and incidents caused by pilot error
Sughd Region
Aviation accidents and incidents in the Soviet Union